This is a list of notable people from Amritsar.

Spiritual leaders
 Guru Hargobind, 6th Guru of Sikhs
 Guru Tegh Bahadur, 9th Guru of Sikhs
 Nawab Kapur Singh, Sikh leader
 Sanaullah Amritsari, Islamic scholar of the Ahl-e-Hadith movement
 Qazi Abdur Rehman Amritsari, historian and writer

Freedom fighters
 Saifuddin Kitchlew, freedom fighter
 Madan Lal Dhingra, independence activist

Defense personnel 
 Baba Deep Singh, General
 Bhagat Singh Thind, US Sikh Leader
 Sam Manekshaw, Field Marshal
 Saurabh Kalia, soldier

Sportspersons
 Abhishek Sharma, cricketer
 Bishan Singh Bedi, cricketer
 Dara Singh, wrestler and actor
 Ghulam Mohammad Baksh, wrestler
 Madan Lal, cricketer
 Ramandeep Singh, footballer
 Ashok Malhotra
 Gursharan Singh
 Sarandeep Singh
 Vinay Choudhary
 Harvinder Singh
 Sharad Lumba
 Chandan Madan
 Vijay Mehra (Indian cricketer)

Politicians
 Manmohan Singh, 13th Prime Minister of India
 Navjot Singh Sidhu, politician
 Raghunandan Lal Bhatia, politician
 Krishan Kant, 10th Vice-President of India
 Raj Kumar Verka, politician

Entertainers
 Akshay Kumar, actor
 Amrinder Gill, Punjabi singer
 Bharti Singh, Indian stand-up comedian
 Chandan Prabhakar, comedian
 Deepa Mehta, Indo-Canadian filmmaker
 Deepti Naval, actress
 Geeta Bali, actress
 Gurpreet Ghuggi, Punjabi Comedian
 Gurshabad, Playback Singer and actor
 Jeetendra, actor
 Kapil Sharma, comedian
 Mahendra Kapoor, playback singer
 Maurice Barrymore, (patriarch of the Barrymore acting family)
 Mohammed Rafi, recording artist
 Narendra Chanchal, singer
 Pramod Moutho, Indian actor
 Prem Dhillon, Punjabi singer
 Rajesh Khanna, actor
 Richa Chadda , actress
 Rohan Mehra, actor
 Sahila Chadha, actress
 Shamshad Begum, classical singer
 Sudesh Lehri, comedian
 Veeru Devgan, director and producer of Hindi films
 Vinod Mehra, actor
 Vipul Mehta, singer
 Waris Ahluwalia, model, actor in US
 Yash Johar, director and producer of Hindi films

Writers
 Abdul Hameed, writer
 Bhisham Sahni, Hindi writer
 Dalbir Chetan, Punjabi short-story writer
 Ghulam Abbas, writer
 M. D. Taseer, Urdu poet
 Rupa Bajwa, writer
 Saadat Hasan Manto, writer
 Vir Singh, Punjabi poet
 Qazi Abdur Rehman Amritsari, Urdu poet and writer who proposed the name of Pakistan's new capital city Islamabad.

Others

 Bhagat Puran Singh, environmentalist
 Hans Raj Khanna, Judge at the Supreme court of India
 Kiran Bedi, First woman IPS officer
 Laxmi Kanta Chawla, politician
 Ritu Kumar, Fashion Designer
 Shammi Rana, Indian sports executive and administrator
 Vikas Khanna, chef

See also 
 List of people by India state

References 

 
Amritsar
Lists of people from Punjab, India